The Christian Democratic Women's league is the women's wing of the Christian Democratic Party in Sweden. The organisation was founded in 1982 and is working to promote gender equality and promote the woman's position in society. The organisation, whose membership is open to both genders, is actively working to interest and support women in the political work. At the end of 2005, the organisation had 2270 members.

Chairman:
1982 Laila Hultberg 
1983-1996 Margareta Viklund 
1996-2002 Ulla-Britt Hagström 
2002- Désirée Pethrus Engström

External Links:

Christian Democratic Women's league

Christian Democrats (Sweden)

Women's wings of political parties
1982 establishments in Sweden
Organizations established in 1982
Women's organizations based in Sweden